Robert Détroyat (8 January 1911 – June 1941) was a French naval officer and Compagnon de la Libération. He served in the French Navy before joining the Free French Forces. He was the cousin of French aviator Michel Détroyat.

Career 
Son of Brigadier General Marie Armand Paul André Détroyat, he studied in Paris, Rome, Sainte-Croix de Neuilly where he obtained the baccalaureate in 1927, then at Sainte-Geneviève de Versailles.  

He entered the Naval Academy in 1929 and left it in 1931 with the rank of ensign.  

He served in the Naval Forces of the Levant, then in the Marines. He was promoted to lieutenant in 1939.  

Returned to France in February 1940, he was appointed commander of Chasseur 5 in Cherbourg.  

In July 1940, following the appeal of June 18, he joined the Free French Naval Forces.  

He was entrusted with the mission of forming a unit of Marines by Admiral Muselier. Commander of the 1st Battalion of Marines (1er BFM), he was promoted to Lieutenant Commander and embarked aboard the Westernland towards Dakar in August 1940. He took part in the Battle of Gabon, then found himself towards the Suez Canal and Syria. He advanced towards Damascus at the head of his troops on 21 June 1941 and stopped at Mezze. He was mortally wounded by a burst of submachine gun while going to join his assistant Jean des Moutis.  

He is buried in Saint-Pierre-d'Irube.

Awards 
 
 Légion d'honneur (Chevalier)

 Compagnon de la Libération

 Croix de Guerre 1939–1945

 Croix de guerre des théâtres d'opérations extérieures

 Médaille de la Résistance

Legacy 

 A French D'Estienne d'Orves-class aviso has been named after him.
 The Marine Military Preparation of Tours PMM "Captain of Corvette Détroyat" is named in his honor.
 The Mediterranean Marines Battalion was named the Détroyat Marines Battalion on 1 September 2021.

See also 

 French military ranks

References 

 Biography on the website of the Order of the Liberation
 Naval school [archive]
 Hubert Granier, "History of French sailors: World War II and the first revolts in the Empire, 1940-1945" (2008)
 Pierre de Longuemar, “Memorial 1939-1945: the commitment of members of the nobility and their allies” (2001)
 Georges-Marc Benamou, “The rebels of the year 40” (2010)
 Remy, "An Epic of the Resistance ...: In France, Belgium and the Grand Duchy of Luxembourg" (1981)
 Henri Darrieus, Jean Quéguiner, “History of the French Navy: 1922-1942” (1996)
 "In that time, de Gaulle, Volume 1" (1971)

1911 births
1941 deaths
Military personnel from Tours, France
Recipients of the Croix de Guerre 1939–1945 (France)
Chevaliers of the Légion d'honneur
Companions of the Liberation
French Resistance members
French military personnel killed in World War II
French Navy personnel of World War II
Free French Naval Forces officers
Deaths by firearm in Syria